The 2004 Colchester Borough Council election took place on 10 June 2004 to elect members of Colchester Borough Council in Essex, England. This was the same day as the other 2004 United Kingdom local elections and as the 2004 European Parliament Elections. One third of the seats were up for election and the council stayed under no overall control.

Background

Following the previous election, Cllr Bob Newman (Wivenhoe Quay) left the Labour group to sit as an independent, reducing Labour to 4 councillors. Labour then went into opposition after refusing to work with the Conservatives and a new cabinet was formed with 4 Conservative and 4 Liberal Democrat members.

A by-election took place in Wivenhoe Quay ward after the death of sitting Independent councillor Richard Davies. The by-election was won by Labour, increasing their seat count to 5.

Election result
The Conservatives gained 4 seats to become the largest party on the council with 28 seats, 3 short of a majority. They overtook the Liberal Democrats who held 23 seats, Labour with 6 seats and 3 independents. Overall turnout at the election was 34.4%.

As a result, the Conservatives took all the seats on the council cabinet for the first time since that style of government was introduced in Colchester, with the Conservative group leader John Jowers becoming the new leader of the council.

Ward results

Berechurch

Castle

No Green candidate as previous (8.0%).

Dedham & Langham

East Donyland

Harbour

Highwoods

Lexden

Marks Tey

Mile End

No Independent (9.4%) or Green (3.0%) candidates as previous.

New Town

Prettygate

St. Andrew's

No Socialist Alliance candidate as previous (3.1%).

St. Anne's

No Socialist Alliance candidate as previous (2.1%).

St. John's

Shrub End

No Socialist Alliance candidate as previous (1.5%).

Stanway

Tiptree

West Mersea

Wivenhoe Cross

Wivenhoe Quay

By-elections

Berechurch

A by-election took place on 21 October 2004 in Berechurch after the resignation of Liberal Democrat councillor Susan Brooks. Labour's Dave Harris took the seat from the Liberal Democrats by a majority of 345.

References

2004 English local elections
2004
2000s in Essex